El Regreso is a live album by Andrés Calamaro. The album title means "the return" and marks the comeback of Andres Calamaro onto the musical scene following a personal crisis that was the result of breaking up with his longtime girlfriend.

The album was recorded during shows at Estadio Luna Park in Buenos Aires.

Track listing
El Cantante (Rubén Blades) - 5:00
El Salmón (Andrés Calamaro, Marcelo Scornik) - 2:48
Te Quiero Igual (Andrés Calamaro, Clota Ponieman) - 3:53
Tuyo Siempre (Andrés Calamaro) - 3:09
Las Opportunidades (Andrés Calamaro) - 3:19
Clonazepán y Circo (Andrés Calamaro, Marcelo Scornik, Gringui Herrera) - 3:00
Para No Olvidar (Andrés Calamaro) - 4:24
Los Aviones (Andrés Calamaro) - 4:26
Crímenes Perfectos (Andrés Calamaro) - 4:22
Loco (Andrés Calamaro) - 2:34
Vigilante Medio Argentino (Marcelo Scornik, Andrés Calamaro) - 2:40
La Libertad (Andrés Calamaro, Gringui Herrera) - 3:23
Estadio Azteca (Marcelo Scornik, Andrés Calamaro) - 4:01
Por Una Cabeza (Alfredo Le Pera, Carlos Gardel) - 3:13
Nos Volveremos a Ver (Jorge Larrosa, Andrés Calamaro) - 3:14
Media Verónica (Andrés Calamaro) - 3:55
No Me Nombres (Marcelo Scornik, Andrés Calamaro) - 3:58
Desconfío (Norberto Napolitano) - 4:30
OK Perdón (Andrés Calamaro) - 2:50
Flaca (Andrés Calamaro) - 4:16
Paloma (Andrés Calamaro) - 5:36

Certification

References

Andrés Calamaro albums
2005 live albums
Albums recorded at Estadio Luna Park